The 1995 Pan American Games were held in Mar del Plata, Argentina. Team and individual shooting contests were organized for men and women.The canoeing competitions at the 1995 Pan American Games took place in Mar Del Plata, Argentina. The United States won 24 of the 36 gold medals awarded.

Men's events

Women's events

Men's team events

Women's team events

Medal table

References

Results at conatiro.org

Events at the 1995 Pan American Games
1995 in shooting sports
Shooting at the Pan American Games
Shooting competitions in Argentina